Mason Alan Dinehart Sr. (born Harold Alan Dinehart; October 3, 1889 – July 18, 1944) was an American actor, director, writer, and stage manager.

Biography

Dinehart initially studied to be a priest, but he turned to the theater instead. His first acting experience came at Missoula University in Montana. He was active in Vaudeville before moving into other areas of entertainment.

He left school to appear on stage with a repertory company and had no screen experience when he signed a contract with Fox in May 1931. He became a character actor and supporting player in at least eighty-eight films between 1931 and 1944. Earlier, he appeared in more than twenty Broadway plays.

Dinehart co-wrote and starred in the Broadway play Separate Rooms, which opened on March 23, 1940 at the Maxine Elliott Theatre and ran for 613 performances.

Dinehart's likeness was drawn in caricature by Alex Gard for Sardi's, the New York City theater district restaurant. The picture is now part of the collection of the New York Public Library.

Dinehart's second son, Mason Alan Dinehart, was cast in several 1950s television series, including the role of a young Bat Masterson in the ABC/Desilu Studios western, The Life and Legend of Wyatt Earp, starring Hugh O'Brian in the title role.

Personal life
In 1936, Dinehart had his name legally changed to Mason Alan Dinehart. He had been baptized Harold Alan Dinehart, but his wife explained that the change would permit their son to be legally named Alan Dinehart III.

Death
Dinehart suffered heart failure and died on 17 July 1944. Some reports stated the cause as a heart attack and the day of death as July 18 at age 54.

Selected filmography

The Brat (1931) - MacMillan Forrester
Wicked (1931) - Blake
Girls About Town (1931) - Jerry Chase
Good Sport (1931) - Rex Parker
Disorderly Conduct (1932) - Fletcher
Devil's Lottery (1932) - American (uncredited)
The Trial of Vivienne Ware (1932) - Prosecutor
Street of Women (1932) - Lawrence 'Larry' Baldwin
Bachelor's Affairs (1932) - Luke Radcliff 
Almost Married (1932) - Inspector Slante
Okay, America! (1932) - Roger Jones
Washington Merry-Go-Round (1932) - Norton
Rackety Rax (1932) - Counsellor Sultsfeldt
The Devil Is Driving (1932) - Jenkins
Lawyer Man (1932) - Granville Bentley
As the Devil Commands  (1932)  - Robert Waldo
Sweepings (1933) - Thane Pardway
Supernatural (1933) - Paul Bavian
A Study in Scarlet (1933) - Merrydew
I Have Lived (1933) - Thomas Langley
Her Bodyguard (1933) - Lester Cunningham
No Marriage Ties (1933) - 'Perk' Perkins
The Road Is Open Again (1933, short subject, as George Washington) - George Washington
Dance Girl Dance  (1933) - Wade 'Val' Valentine
As the Devil Commands (1933) - Robert Waldo
Bureau of Missing Persons (1933) - Therme Roberts
Fury of the Jungle (1933) - Taggart
The World Changes (1933) - Ogden Jarrett
The Sin of Nora Moran (1933) - District Attorney John Grant
Cross Country Cruise (1934) - Steve Borden
The Crosby Case (1934) - Police Inspector Thomas
Jimmy the Gent (1934) - Charles Wallingham
A Very Honorable Guy (1934) - The Brain
The Love Captive (1934) - Roger Loft
Baby Take a Bow (1934) - Welch
The Cat's-Paw (1934) - Mayor Ed Morgan
Lottery Lover (1935) - Edward Arthur 'Tank' Tankersley
$10 Raise (1935) - Fuller
Dante's Inferno (1935) - Jonesy
Redheads on Parade (1935) - George Magnus
The Payoff (1935) - Marty
Thanks a Million (1935) - Mr. Kruger
In Old Kentucky (1935) - Slick Doherty
Your Uncle Dudley (1935) - Charlie Post
It Had to Happen (1936) - Rodman Dreke
Everybody's Old Man (1936) - Frederick Gillespie
The Country Beyond (1936) - Ray Jennings
Human Cargo (1936) - Lionel Crocker
Parole! (1936) - Richard Mallard
The Crime of Dr. Forbes (1936) - Prosecuting Attorney
Charlie Chan at the Race Track (1936) - George Chester
Star for a Night (1936) - James Dunning
King of the Royal Mounted (1936) - Frank Becker
Reunion (1936) - Philip Crandell
Born to Dance (1936) - McKay
Woman-Wise (1937) - Richards
Step Lively, Jeeves! (1937) - Hon. Cedric B. Cromwell
Midnight Taxi (1937) - Philip Strickland
This Is My Affair (1937) - Doc Keller
Fifty Roads to Town (1937) - Jerome Kendall
Dangerously Yours (1937) - Julien Stevens
Danger – Love at Work (1937) - Allan Duncan
Ali Baba Goes to Town (1937) - Boland
Big Town Girl (1937) - Larry Edwards
Love on a Budget (1938) - Charles M. Dixon / Uncle Charlie
The First Hundred Years (1938) - Samuel Z. Walker
Rebecca of Sunnybrook Farm (1938) - Purvis
Up the River (1938) - Warden Clarence Willis
Fast and Loose (1939) - Dave Hilliard
King of the Turf (1939) - Nick Grimes
Second Fiddle (1939) - George 'Whit' Whitney
The House of Fear (1939) - Joseph Morton
Hotel for Women (1939) - Stephen Gates
Two Bright Boys (1939) - Bill Hallet
Everything Happens at Night (1939) - Fred Sherwood
Slightly Honorable (1939) - Commissioner Joyce
Girl Trouble (1942) - Charles Barrett
It's a Great Life (1943) - Collender Martin
Fired Wife (1943) - Jerry Donohue
Sweet Rosie O'Grady (1943) - Arthur Skinner
The Heat's On (1943) - Forrest Stanton
What a Woman! (1943) - Pat O'Shea
The Whistler (1943) - Gorman
Moon Over Las Vegas (1944) - Hal Blake
Seven Days Ashore (1944) - Daniel Arland
Johnny Doesn't Live Here Any More (1944) - Judge
Minstrel Man (1944) - Lew Dunn
Oh, What a Night (1944) - Detective Norris
A Wave, a WAC and a Marine (1944) - R. J., the Producer (final film role)

References

External links

 
 
 
 

American male film actors
American male stage actors
Male actors from Saint Paul, Minnesota
1889 births
1944 deaths
Male actors from Los Angeles
Burials at Forest Lawn Memorial Park (Glendale)
20th-century American male actors
Vaudeville performers
Broadway theatre directors